Lieutenant-General Sir Herbert Taylor  (29 September 1775 – 20 March 1839) was the first Private Secretary to the Sovereign of the United Kingdom, serving George III, George IV, and William IV.

Military career
Taylor was the son of Rev. Edward Taylor of Bifrons, Patrixbourne, Kent and his wife Margaret Payler daughter of Thomas Turner Payler of Ileden, who died at Brussels in 1780. The diplomat Sir Brook Taylor was his younger brother. He joined the 2nd Dragoon Guards as a cornet in 1794. Later that year he was promoted to lieutenant and then the following year to captain. In 1795 he served as assistant secretary and aide de camp to the Duke of York, then commander-in-chief of the British Army. Taylor was later the Duke of York's assistant military secretary, an office he held until 1798. He was later a Major. In 1798 he was made Aide de Camp, Military Secretary and Private Secretary to the Marquess Cornwallis, Lord Lieutenant of Ireland. In the following year he returned to the Duke of York's service and remained there until 1805, although he was transferred to the 9th West Indian Regiment as a lieutenant-colonel in 1801.

However, in the following year, with a period of relative calm in the midst of the Napoleonic Wars, he was placed on half pay. In that year he joined the Coldstream Guards, in which he became a brevet colonel in 1810. In 1805 he became private secretary to King George III, and then, from 1811 private secretary to Queen Charlotte, the queen consort. He retained that office until 1818.

Taylor commanded a brigade at Antwerp 1813–1814, and was sent on a diplomatic mission to Bernadotte of Sweden in 1814. He was Member of Parliament (MP) for Windsor 1820–23. From 1820 to 1827 he was Ambassador to Berlin and then Military Secretary, having become colonel for life of the 85th Foot Regiment in 1823. He was first and principal aide de camp to King George IV in 1827, and also deputy Secretary at War. From 1828 to 1830 he was Adjutant-General to the Forces. He became private secretary to the new king, William IV, in 1830. On the death of the king in 1837 he retired, although he was first and principal aide de camp to Queen Victoria 1837–39.

Taylor became a Major-General in 1813, and a Lieutenant-General in 1825. He was Master of St Katherine's Hospital, Regent's Park, and Master Surveyor and Surveyor-General of the Ordnance from 1828. He died in 1839. The monument to him at St. Katherine's is by the sculptor Peter Rouw.

References

|-

 

|-
 

1775 births
1839 deaths
British Army generals
Members of the Parliament of the United Kingdom for English constituencies
Knights Grand Cross of the Order of the Bath
UK MPs 1820–1826
2nd Dragoon Guards (Queen's Bays) officers
Coldstream Guards officers
Private Secretaries to the Sovereign
Members of the Privy Council of the United Kingdom